Opon River is a river of northern Colombia. It flows into the Magdalena River.

See also
List of rivers of Colombia

References
Rand McNally, The New International Atlas, 1993.

Rivers of Colombia